René Cattarinussi (born 12 April 1972) is a former Italian biathlete.

He won a bronze medal in the sprint at the 1996 World Championships in Ruhpolding. The following year, at the 1997 World Championships in Brezno-Osrblie, he conquered a silver medal in the sprint event and a bronze in the relay. He also won a bronze and a silver medal in the sprint distance at the 2000 World Championships in Oslo and at the 2001 World Championships in Pokljuka.

Cattarinussi retired as a biathlete after the 2002–03 season.

Biathlon results
All results are sourced from the International Biathlon Union.

Olympic Games

*Pursuit was added as an event in 2002.

World Championships
6 medals (2 silver, 4 bronze)

*During Olympic seasons competitions are only held for those events not included in the Olympic program.
**Team was removed as an event in 1998, and pursuit was added in 1997 with mass start being added in 1999.

Individual victories
2 victories (1 Sp, 1 MS)

*Results are from UIPMB and IBU races which include the Biathlon World Cup, Biathlon World Championships and the Winter Olympic Games.

Further notable results
 1995: 2nd, Italian championships of biathlon, sprint
 1996: 2nd, Italian championships of biathlon, sprint
 1997:
 1st, Italian championships of biathlon
 3rd, Italian championships of biathlon, sprint
 1998:
 1st, Italian championships of biathlon, pursuit
 3rd, Italian championships of biathlon, sprint
 1999:
 1st, Italian championships of biathlon, sprint
 2nd, Italian championships of biathlon
 2000:
 1st, Italian championships of biathlon, sprint
 2nd, Italian championships of biathlon, pursuit
 2001:
 1st, Italian championships of biathlon, pursuit
 3rd, Italian championships of biathlon, sprint
 2002: 1st, Italian championships of biathlon, sprint
 2003:
 1st, Italian championships of biathlon, sprint
 1st, Italian championships of biathlon, pursuit

References

External links
 
 
 

1972 births
Living people
People from Tolmezzo
Italian male biathletes
Biathletes at the 1998 Winter Olympics
Biathletes at the 2002 Winter Olympics
Olympic biathletes of Italy
Biathlon World Championships medalists
Sportspeople from Friuli-Venezia Giulia